Mauro Oscar Coelho da Silva (born 2 February 1984), commonly known as Mauro, is a former Portuguese professional footballer.

Career statistics

Club

Notes

References

External links
 

1984 births
Living people
People from Penafiel
Portuguese footballers
Portugal youth international footballers
Association football defenders
Liga Portugal 2 players
FC Porto players
Chelsea F.C. players
F.C. Penafiel players
U.S.C. Paredes players
F.C. Marco players
Portuguese expatriate footballers
Expatriate footballers in England
Portuguese expatriate sportspeople in England
Sportspeople from Porto District